Hugues Frayer (31 January 1923 – 28 April 1996) was a French hurdler. He competed in the men's 110 metres hurdles at the 1948 Summer Olympics and the men's decathlon at the 1952 Summer Olympics.

References

1923 births
1996 deaths
Athletes (track and field) at the 1948 Summer Olympics
Athletes (track and field) at the 1952 Summer Olympics
French male hurdlers
French decathletes
Olympic athletes of France
Athletes from Paris
20th-century French people